Petra Kvitová defeated Eugenie Bouchard in the final, 6–3, 6–0 to win the ladies' singles tennis title at the 2014 Wimbledon Championships. It was her second Wimbledon title and she lost only one set en route, to Venus Williams in the third round.

Marion Bartoli was the reigning champion, but retired from professional tennis in August 2013.

Like at that year's French Open, the tournament was marked by two big upsets. The top two seeds – Serena Williams and Li Na – both lost in the third round. This marked the first time in the Open Era that neither of the top two seeds at Wimbledon reached the fourth round. Five-time Wimbledon champion Williams' defeat to 25th-seeded Alizé Cornet equalled her earliest exit from the tournament (she lost at the same stage in 1998 and 2005). Li fell to unseeded Barbora Záhlavová-Strýcová, in what would be her final professional tennis match before she announced her retirement almost three months later.

The final
Sixth-seeded Kvitová defeated her compatriot and 23rd-seeded Lucie Šafářová, 7–6(8–6), 6–1 in the first semifinal, while 13th-seeded Eugenie Bouchard defeated third-seeded Simona Halep, 7–6(7–5), 6–2 in the other. Bouchard, playing in only her sixth grand slam tournament, advanced to the final without losing a set, becoming the first Canadian tennis player to reach the singles final of a grand slam. The title match was the first grand slam final contested between two players born in the 1990s. In the first set, Kvitová broke in the third game and broke again in the seventh to establish a 5–2 lead. With Kvitová serving for the set, Bouchard broke back, but Kvitová did the same in the following game to take the first set 6–3. The second set saw Kvitová lose only three points on serve as she bagelled Bouchard 6–0. Only 10 other Wimbledon women singles champions lost "fewer games in the final than Kvitova did".

The victory gave Kvitová her second Wimbledon title and second Grand Slam title overall. After the tournament, Bouchard improved to a career-high World No. 7 in the WTA rankings, surpassing Carling Bassett-Seguso's record of being the highest-ranked Canadian woman of all-time, while Kvitová moved up to World No. 4.

Seeds 

  Serena Williams (third round)
  Li Na (third round)
  Simona Halep (semifinals)
  Agnieszka Radwańska (fourth round)
  Maria Sharapova (fourth round)
  Petra Kvitová (champion)
  Jelena Janković (first round)
  Victoria Azarenka (second round)
  Angelique Kerber (quarterfinals)
  Dominika Cibulková (third round)
  Ana Ivanovic (third round)
  Flavia Pennetta (second round)
  Eugenie Bouchard (final)
  Sara Errani (first round)
  Carla Suárez Navarro (second round)
  Caroline Wozniacki (fourth round)

  Samantha Stosur (first round)
  Sloane Stephens (first round)
  Sabine Lisicki (quarterfinals)
  Andrea Petkovic (third round)
  Roberta Vinci (first round)
  Ekaterina Makarova (quarterfinals)
  Lucie Šafářová (semifinals)
  Kirsten Flipkens (third round)
  Alizé Cornet (fourth round)
  Anastasia Pavlyuchenkova (first round)
  Garbiñe Muguruza (first round)
  Svetlana Kuznetsova (first round)
  Sorana Cîrstea (first round)
  Venus Williams (third round)
  Klára Koukalová (second round)
  Elena Vesnina (second round)

Qualifying

Draw

Finals

Top half

Section 1

Section 2

Section 3

Section 4

Bottom half

Section 5

Section 6

Section 7

Section 8

Championship match statistics

References

External links

2014 Wimbledon Championships on WTAtennis.com
2014 Wimbledon Championships – Women's draws and results at the International Tennis Federation

Women's Singles
Wimbledon Championship by year – Women's singles
Wimbledon Championships
Wimbledon Championships